Thuli Dladla is an Swazi politician and diplomat who has been serving as the Minister of Foreign Affairs of the Kingdom of Eswatini since November 2018. She is the country's first female foreign minister and was previously a senator. In February 2019 she visited Taiwan and met with President Tsai Ing-wen.

References

Swazi politicians
Foreign Ministers of Eswatini
Living people
Women government ministers of Eswatini
Year of birth missing (living people)
Female foreign ministers